Young Man is the debut studio album by American country music artist Billy Dean, released in 1990 by Capitol Nashville. It produced two hit singles: "Only Here for a Little While" and "Somewhere in My Broken Heart". Both of these songs peaked at #3 on the Billboard Hot Country Singles & Tracks (now Hot Country Songs) charts, with the latter also reaching #18 on the Hot Adult Contemporary Tracks charts in both the United States and Canada. The album has been certified gold by the RIAA for U.S. sales of 500,000 copies.

The track "Somewhere in My Broken Heart" was previously recorded by Randy Travis on his 1989 album No Holdin' Back. Also, "Brotherly Love" was recorded by Keith Whitley and Earl Thomas Conley on Whitley's posthumous 1991 album Kentucky Bluebird, from which it was released as a single.

Track listing

Personnel
As adapted from liner notes:
Eddie Bayers - drums
Barry Beckett - piano
Michael Black - backing vocals
Jessica Boucher - backing vocals
Bruce Bouton - pedal steel guitar
Billy Dean - lead and backing vocals, acoustic guitar
Jerry Douglas - dobro
Paul Franklin - pedal steel guitar
Rick Giles - backing vocals
Rob Hajacos - fiddle
John Barlow Jarvis - keyboards, piano
Mike Lawler - keyboards
Chris Leuzinger - electric guitar
Brent Mason - electric guitar
Terry McMillan - harmonica, percussion
Mark O'Connor - mandolin
Dave Pomeroy - bass guitar
Michael Rhodes - bass guitar
Brent Rowan - acoustic and electric guitars
Pat Severs - pedal steel guitar
Billy Joe Walker, Jr. - acoustic and electric guitars
Biff Watson - acoustic guitar, keyboards
Dennis Wilson - backing vocals
Lonnie Wilson - drums
Glenn Worf - bass guitar
Reggie Young - electric guitar

Chart performance

Weekly charts

Year-end charts

References

1990 debut albums
Billy Dean albums
Capitol Records albums